David Bashevkin (also spelled Dovid Bashevkin, born February 15, 1985) is an American rabbi, writer, professor, and podcast host based in New York. He is currently Director of Education of NCSY, an Orthodox Union youth group.

Early life and education
Bashevkin is a graduate of DRS HALB (Davis Renov Stahler Yeshiva High School for Boys). He earned his bachelor's degree in Talmudic Studies at Ner Israel Rabbinical College in 2006. After receiving his rabbinic ordination at Yeshiva University's Rabbi Isaac Elchanan Theological Seminary, he graduated with a Master of Arts (MA) degree in Polish Hassidut under Yaakov Elman at Yeshiva University's Bernard Revel Graduate School of Jewish Studies in 2010. From 2013 to 2022, he studied for a Ph.D. in Public Policy and Management at The New School's Milano School of International Affairs, Management, and Urban Policy, where he focused on crisis management.

Career

NCSY 
Bashevkin began his academic career as an associate director of education at NCSY, the youth division of the Orthodox Union, from 2010 to 2013 before becoming the group's director of education. As the leader of NCSY, he has directed many youth seminars and programs and has also developed curricula for staff and teens.

Academia 
Bashevkin served as an adjunct professor at Long Island University from 2010 to 2011. He currently teaches courses on public policy, religious crisis, and rabbinic thought at Yeshiva University in the Isaac Breuer College of Hebraic Studies as well the Sy Syms School of Business.

Writing 
Bashevkin wrote a humor column entitled "Top 5" for Mishpacha magazine in which he cataloged the idiosyncrasies and nuances of Jewish life. He has also written essays for Tablet on tractates of the Talmud as they have been learned in the Daf Yomi sequence.

Podcasts 
Bashevkin developed a Tablet Daf Yomi podcast called Take One with Liel Leibovitz. In 2020, Bashevkin launched the 18Forty podcast to treat traditional Jewish issues in a modern context. The podcasts are organized by topic with each topic featuring 2-4 guests. Past topics included Biblical criticism, "Off the derech," and Jewish mysticism, and past guests included Gary Gulman, Moshe Weinberger, and Jeremy England.

Publications

Books
Bashevkin's published books include B'Rogez Rachem Tizkor Sin•a•gogue: Sin and Failure in Jewish Thoughts, and Top 5: Lists of Jewish Character and Characters.

Sin•a•gogue draws extensively from the works of Rabbi Zadok HaKohen Rabinowitz, a 19th-century Chasidic rabbi. Many of Bashevkin's ideas in the book were based on Zadok's theology on sin.

He also authored the NCSY Haggadah entitled Just One.

Articles
Bashevkin has written various articles on Jewish theology. He has published many other articles on sin, failure, and Jewish doctrine and tradition, including the application of Jewish scripture in the 21st-century digital age.

Some of his published articles are:
"Thoughts and Prayers Do Help," Wall Street Journal (1 June 2022).
"#MeToo Should Include #SinToo," Wall Street Journal (3 October 2019).
"Failure Comes To Yeshivah," Jewish Action (Spring 2019): 62–64.
"Rabbi’s Son Syndrome: Religious Struggle in a World of Religious Ideals," Jewish Action (Summer 2017): 38–44.
"Jonah and the Varieties of Religious Motivation," The Lehrhaus (9 October 2016).
"Letters of Love and Rebuke From Rav Yitzchok Hutner," Tablet Magazine (10 October 2016).
"Medium Matters: The Medium and Message of Torah in the Digital Age," Shavuot-To-Go (2016): 6–9.
"A Radical Theology and a Traditional Community: On the Contemporary Application of Izbica–Lublin Hasidut in the Jewish Community," TorahMusings.com (August 2015): 54–68.
"The Forgotten Talmud: On Teaching Aggadah in High Schools," Jewish Action (Fall 2015).
"Life is Full of Failure: Bio Blurbs Should Be Too," First Things (8 May 2014).
"The Custom to Recite the Priestly Blessings After Birkat ha-Torah," ha-Maor 68:1 (2015): 86-90 (in Hebrew).
"The Pew Report’s Lesser-Known Cousin: The Phew Report," Jewish Action (Summer 2014).
"The Jewish Community Confronts Its Crisis Crisis," Jewish Action (Summer 2013).
"Perpetual Prophecy: An Intellectual Tribute to Reb Zadok ha-Kohen of Lublin on his 110th Yahrzeit," Seforim (19 August 2010).

See also
Yaakov Elman
Zadok HaKohen

References

External links
https://dbashideas.com/ official website
Articles and lectures on YUTorah
Academia.edu page
Mishpacha articles
@DBashIdeas / Twitter

Living people
Yeshiva University alumni
The New School alumni
Yeshiva University faculty
American Jewish theologians
Jewish American writers
American podcasters
Long Island University faculty
Jewish educators
Orthodox rabbis from New York City
21st-century American Jews
1985 births